Twilight of Love (also known as The Night of the High Tide and Lure of Love) is a 1977 Italian romance film written and directed by Luigi Scattini. It is based on the novel Il corpo by Alfredo Todisco. it was one of the last times Steel would be top billed in a movie.

Plot 
Richard, an elderly director of a Montreal advertising agency, met Dyanne, a young girl who appears to be a perfect model for the launch of a new perfume.
During the stay on a beautiful deserted island, where they had gone to make the photo shoot, Richard falls in love with the girl.

Cast 

Anthony Steel as Richard Butler
Annie Belle as Dyanne
Hugo Pratt as Pierre
Pam Grier as Sandra
Giacomo Rossi-Stuart as Guide
Alain Montpetit as Photographer
Gerardo Amato as Philip

References

External links 

1970s Italian-language films
1970s romance films
Italian romance films
Films set on islands
Films directed by Luigi Scattini
Films scored by Piero Umiliani
1970s Italian films